Whoonga (also known as nyaope or wonga) is a form of black tar heroin, sometimes mixed with other substances, that came into widespread use in South Africa in 2009. Its use is concentrated in the impoverished townships of Durban, although it is supposedly appearing in other places in South Africa as well.

Whoonga dealers will often sell the drug as a super-powerful marijuana blend. Dealers add powdered substances to the mix to bulk up the size, profiting more from sale of the diluted drug. Additives range from actual pharmaceutical drugs and cleaning chemicals to any powder-based substance that can be found. Whoonga/nayope is very addictive because of its heroin content as well as from the uncertainty of the type of any cutting additives.

Whoonga is sometimes said to contain antiretroviral drugs, particularly efavirenz, which are prescribed to treat HIV, but analysis of samples shows no such content, and police have remarked that dealers are known to add "all sorts of stuff" to a drug to bulk it out. This adulteration was the subject of Getting High on HIV Medication, a 2014 documentary video by Vice correspondent Hamilton Morris. The first scientific publications of whoonga use containing ARVs were in 2013 and 2014.

Usage 
Whoonga is a recreational drug. It generates intense feelings of euphoria, deep contentment, and relaxation. It also reduces appetite. Effects of whoonga may last two to four hours. The drug is usually smoked with cannabis in the form of a joint, but methods of preparation for injection do exist.

The cost of whoonga is reported to be about 30 rand (Approximately US$2.50, as of April 2018) per straw. A whoonga addict needs several doses a day; however, users are typically too poor to afford the drug from legal income, and so turn to crime to raise the money for their supply. There are also speculative reports that whoonga addicts are attempting to become HIV-positive, as anti-retrovirals are distributed to HIV patients free of charge by the South African Department of Health.

In early 2017, a growing trend of sharing the drug-induced high through small blood transfusions was identified by local media in a practice known as "bluetoothing" (from the Bluetooth wireless technology). In reality, such a blood sample could not contain an active quantity of the drug, and the practice is virtually unheard of on the street.

Adverse effects 
The effects of whoonga typically wear off in 6 to 24 hours, allowing for the onset of unpleasant side-effects. These include stomach cramps, backaches, sweating, chills, anxiety, restlessness, depression, nausea, and diarrhea. More serious side-effects include internal bleeding, stomach ulcers, and potentially death.

Contested claims of anti-retroviral content
Whoonga is famous for allegedly containing antiretroviral drugs prescribed for HIV, but its exact ingredients are disputed, and it has been argued that the claim is an urban legend. One version of the claim is that whoonga contains classic psychoactive drugs such as cannabis, methamphetamine or heroin potentiated by interactions with ritonavir, an antiretroviral medication used to treat HIV/AIDS that is thought to enhance or prolong the effects of some street drugs, such as MDMA. Another claim is that the drug contains efavirenz (alone or with the ingredients mentioned above), another antiretroviral which has psychoactive side effects. Dr. David Grelotti has noted that efavirenz has a "well-known tendency to cause especially vivid and colorful dreams and other central nervous system effects. Hypothetically, that could enhance the effects of cannabis, methamphetamine, heroin, and other illicit drugs."

AIDS experts point out that the ingredients of anti-retroviral drugs are unlikely to cause the whoonga high, and users may thus be fooling themselves. A laboratory analysis of samples of whoonga failed to detect any anti-retroviral drugs in its makeup, and a medical scientist who has analysed the contents of the drug concluded that it does not contain AIDS anti-retroviral medication. According to some experts of the South African Police Service and drug rehabilitation centres, whoonga is essentially just a rebranding of older heroin-based drugs. A member of the South African police's Organised Crime Unit said that "drug dealers add all sorts of stuff to the heroin, the primary ingredient, just to increase the mass of the drug when it's sold and make the heroin go further. A lot of the stuff has no effect and users have no idea what's going in."

The anti-retroviral drugs allegedly used to make whoonga are those distributed in the area to patients with HIV who are enrolled in government drug rehabilitation projects. The claimed major source of these anti-retrovirals appears to be robbery from HIV patients, with media reports claiming that patients are being mugged for their pills as they leave the clinics where they obtain them. Reports also claim that some patients sell their HIV medications, and that some corrupt health workers may be selling the anti-retrovirals illegally back into the whoonga market.

A Harvard School of Public Health researcher has expressed concern that people with HIV who smoke whoonga may develop mutant strains of the virus which are resistant to the medication. HIV drug resistance is growing due to recreational use of efavirenz and ritonavir, rendering them ineffective not only for users but non-users as well, with one study showing that 3% to 5% of people with HIV in areas where whoonga was used were showing "pre-treatment resistance" to antiretroviral drugs used to treat HIV.

Legal status
As of February 2013, the South African Department of Justice and Constitutional Development was in the process of amending the Drugs and Drug Trafficking Act 140 of 1992 to ban the possession and trafficking of the drug.

See also
 Gray death

References

Further reading
 

Antiretroviral drugs
Crime in South Africa
Drug culture
Culture of Durban
History of South Africa
Slang
South African slang
Polysubstance combinations